Prison Six ( Kele Shesh), officially Confinement Base 396 ( Bsis Kli'a 396) is an Israeli military prison located near Atlit, Israel, on Oren Junction.

It is the second military prison for IDF soldiers, after Prison Four in Tzrifin (Camp Yadin). Prison Six can contain about 350 prisoners.

Prison Six generally contains prisoners from the Northern Command, as well as officers and senior NCOs. During an emergency, the 393rd Battalion takes over Prison Six and converts it into a national POW camp ( mahane shvu'im artzi) for enemy officers and other quality POWs. Israeli prisoners are either released or transferred to Prison Four.

History
Prison Six was conceptualized by an officer named Yaakov Markovich, after an analysis of Prison Four's deteriorating conditions (which would improve if the overcapacity was alleviated). Chief Military Police Officer Yosef Pressman pushed for its construction and it was finally built following the 1956 Sinai War.

1969 flood
On November 22, 1969 at about 21:00, Prison Six was flooded due to a powerful rainstorm, and the water level rose to a level of 2 m. The prison's security was compromised when the powerful water current destroyed the front gate and created holes in the outer walls. An attempt was made to open the cells, although due to the flow, this was impossible in many cases. Instead, some of the freed prisoners were given tools to scale the cellblocks and destroy their roofs, so that trapped prisoners could be rescued from above. The prisoners of the three last cells, which were impossible to reach, were able to also receive tools, and destroyed the cell walls from within. The electricity was disconnected in fear of electrocution, and the rest of the work was done in the darkness.

None of the prisoners used the flood as a means to escape, and instead helped in the effort to minimize the damage and prevent injury. As a result, the Aluf of the Manpower Directorate, which is responsible for the Military Police Corps including its prisons, decided to release dozens of prisoners and cancel their sentences. Six soldiers were decorated for their actions during their flood, three of them MPs.

Rebellion
On Saturday, August 9, 1997, Prison Six suffered a rebellion in Company Gimel, where several prisoners, led by Gideon Martin, a Russian immigrant (born in Sierra Leone) convicted of rape and illegal drug use, took control of the company's dining room and captured several jail instructors and sergeants. After negotiations, an agreement was reached between the prisoners and the chief military police officer (kamtzar) to release the hostages in exchange for better conditions for the prisoners. The agreement was immediately revoked and the prisoners received greater sentences and were transferred to a civilian prison. The rebellion was predicted by the intelligence gatherers of the prison, but the command did not heed the warning.

The rebellion completely changed the military police's approach to its prison service sector and changes were made in the physical structures of the military prisons, as well as in conditions for both jail instructors and prisoners. Intelligence gatherers also gained prestige and more were recruited.

Following the rebellion, the Ashhal Commission was formed to investigate the incident, and the Dekel Commission was appointed by the General Staff to recommend a policy for the prison section in the IDF.

Progress and timeline
09:30 - Most prisoners come out of the company's dining room, except a small group, who wish to stay to eat more.
10:00 - The religious prisoners return from the company's synagogue in order to eat. They are told to keep quiet by the rebels. As one of the jailors in the dining room comes out, three prisoners bypass him and enter the room despite calls to stop. They subdue and tie the lone jailor inside and do the same to the second one who comes back in to find out why the prisoners didn't heed his calls. The prisoners gradually take control of the other three jailors currently on duty in the company.
10:10 - The company sergeant on duty comes out of the company clubhouse after a prisoner tells him that someone lost consciousness in the dining room. He is subdued and tied as he enters.
10:15 - Another sergeant not on duty at the time enters the dining room and struggles against the rebels. He is subdued and injured. Meanwhile, the hostages attempt to reach the communication devices they carried in order to sound an alarm. They are discovered and beaten. Gideon Martin exchanges some of the hostages' binds (they were mostly bound using bandages) with handcuffs. The final jailor in the company's main area, watching the showers at the time, is subdued with teargas and dragged into the dining room.
10:20 - The jailor on duty in the solitary confinement area, oblivious to the situation, opens the door for a 'medic' to pass through. He is tied and subdued. The prisoners block all entrances to the company with beds and arm themselves with nightsticks, knives, and other equipment taken from the hostages.
11:45 - The commander on duty at the time tries to contact the company's jailors without success.
12:00 - He sends the officer on duty to examine the situation and prepare for noon counting. He receives a call from military police headquarters that the prison has been taken over by rebels. The officer on duty reports that company Gimel's jailors aren't opening the door and from a look from the roof, it seems that the prisoners are running free.

The commander on duty verifies the reports, calls the prison's immediate response squad and arms them with the necessary equipment. Cells in the entire prison are closed and the commander declares an emergency. All other free jailors in Prison Six reinforce the response team. Reinforcements are also called from the military police headquarters, and all soldiers belonging to Prison Six are rousted and summoned to base.

The commander on duty finds out through negotiation that one of the hostages is severely wounded and Gideon Martin, the leader of the rebellion, agrees to release him. The hostage is taken out through the infirmary gate and sheds light on the current situation in the company after questioning.

The rebellion was then dispersed through negotiations. Aluf Gabi Ashkenazi commanded the forces that were to disperse the revolt by force, if necessary.

Reinforcements brought in
During the revolt, an emergency was declared throughout the entire army and nearby units sent reinforcements to aid in the event.

Military police reinforcements:
Megiddo Prison (Unit 384) – 4 military policemen
Bahad 13 – 2 military policemen and one military police officer
Yamlat – 22 military policemen
Central command (military police) (Unit 391) – 18 military policemen and one military police officer
Northern command (military police) (Unit 390) – 11 military policemen
Criminal Investigations Division (Metzah) northern command – 3 military policemen and one military police officer

Others military reinforcements:
Yamam – 40 soldiers and 6 officers
Duvdevan – 17 soldiers and 3 officers
Shayetet 13 – 15 soldiers and 2 officers
Camp Naftali – one bulldozer
Medical Corps headquarters – five medical squads
Ba'ah Adam – stretcher squads
Ramat David Airbase – fire engine
Hospital 10 (Haifa) – battalion aid station

Civilian reinforcements:
Israel Police – 2 policemen from the negotiations department
Atlit Fire Department – fire engine

Structure
Prison Six comprises four main companies, and two assisting companies:
Company Alef (א) - for prisoners serving sentences of 28 days or less, or those who have less than 28 days till their release. This is an open company, i.e. prisoners sleep in an open (but guarded) area, and not in jail cells.
Company Bet (ב) - for new prisoners and those serving medium sentences (1–6 months).
Officers' prison ( ktziniya) - a designated area for officers, civilians working for the army, and most military policemen, who committed crimes during their service.
Company Gimel (ג) - for havushim between 28 and 70 days and other prisoners with sentences higher than 6 months. It also contains detainees awaiting trial and the isolation wing (agaf habodedim).
Company 600 - for all female prisoners, regardless of the severity of their crime or the length of their sentence.
Conveyance company - assists the Yamlat'''s conveyance company in moving prisoners to and from Prison Six.
Headquarters company - provides adjutant and similar services to the prison's staff and prisoners.

In popular culture
HaGashash HaHiver released a skit about Prison Six, where they sang the popular song Uzi Uzi.
An Israeli rap band active since 1998 was named Kele Shesh (Hebrew for Prison Six).
Several Israeli songs mention Prison Six, notably the Mizrahi music single BaKele HaTzva'i (In the Military Prison) by Nuriel, where the protagonist of the song serves a 28-day sentence in Prison Six.
The 2009 Israeli film HaBodedim'' by director Renen Schorr is based on the Prison Six rebellion.

References

Israel Defense Forces
Prisons in Israel
Military prisons
Buildings and structures in Haifa District